Hadhari Saindou Djaffar (born 17 November 1978) is a male sprinter from the Comoros.

He competed at the 2000 Summer Olympics in Sydney, Australia as well at the 2004 Summer Olympics in Athens, Greece in the 100m dash. In 2000, Djaffar finished 7th in Heat 7 with a time of 10.68 s, tying for 67th place in a field of 95 sprinters. In 2004, he finished 7th in Heat 3 with a time of 10.62 s, tying for 55th place and improving his Olympic best by .06 second.

He holds the Comorian records in 100 metres, 200 metres and 400 metres.

References

External links

1978 births
Living people
Comorian male sprinters
Athletes (track and field) at the 1996 Summer Olympics
Athletes (track and field) at the 2000 Summer Olympics
Athletes (track and field) at the 2004 Summer Olympics
Olympic athletes of the Comoros